Ye-eun, also spelled Ye-un, is a Korean feminine given name. The meaning differs based on the hanja used to write each syllable of the name. There are 55 hanja with the reading "ye" and 30 hanja with the reading "eun" on the South Korean government's official list of hanja which may be used in given names. It was the sixth most popular name for baby girls in South Korea in 2008, and ranked ninth in 2009.

People
People with this name include:

 (born 1988), South Korean model
Park Ye-eun (born 1989), South Korean singer, former member of girl group Wonder Girls
 (born 1994), South Korean pole vaulter
Park Ye-eun (born 1996), South Korean ice hockey player
Jang Ye-eun (born 1998), South Korean rapper, member of girl group CLC
Shin Ye-eun (born 1998), South Korean actress

See also
List of Korean given names

References

Korean feminine given names